Camden Township may refer to the following places in the United States:

 Camden Township, Schuyler County, Illinois
 Camden Township, Michigan
 Camden Township, Minnesota
 Camden Township, Ray County, Missouri
 Camden Township, Lorain County, Ohio

Township name disambiguation pages